Habiballah Esmaili (حبیب اله اسماعیلی) is an Iranian historian who was the chief editor of the (now defunct) History Book of the Month History and Geography journal.

References

External links 
History Book of the Month History and Geography

21st-century Iranian historians
Academic journal editors

Living people

Year of birth missing (living people)
History journal editors